is a Japanese professional footballer. He plays for Gamba Osaka in the J1 League.

Career

Gamba Osaka
Meshino signed his first senior contract with Gamba Osaka ahead of the 2017 season and was handed the number 40 jersey. He didn't feature at all in 2017, but Brazilian coach Levir Culpi handed him his J1 League debut in week six of the 2018 campaign, a 1-0 home defeat by Vissel Kobe. He went on to make 11 appearances in J1 League that year as well as five in the J. League cup; where he scored in the 3-2 win away to Sanfrecce Hiroshima on 9 May, and one in the Emperor's Cup.

While still officially a member of Gamba Osaka's youth team, Meshino started playing for Gamba U-23 in J3 League in 2016. He debuted on 13 March in a game against YSCC Yokohama and in total scored one goal in 13 appearances in 2016. After being promoted to a senior contract in 2017, he began to play more regularly; scoring three times in 20 games in 2017. 2018 saw him become more of a regular member of Gamba's J1 league squad, however, he still managed to make 15 appearances in J3; scoring five times, including a double in Gamba's season-opening win over Grulla Morioka on March 11.

Manchester City
On 9 August 2019, Premier League club Manchester City signed Meshino on a three year deal.

Hearts (loan) 
On 4 September 2019, a month after signing for Manchester City, Meshino was loaned to Scottish Premiership club Heart of Midlothian until the end of the season.

Rio Ave (loan)
In September 2020, Meshino joined Primeira Liga club Rio Ave on a two year loan deal. He returned to Manchester City at the end of the 2020–21 season.

Estoril (loan) 
In July 2021, Meshino returned to Portugal, joining Primeira Liga club Estoril on loan for the season.

Gamba Osaka 
On 8 July 2022, Gamba Osaka announced the return of Meshino on a permanent transfer.

Career statistics

First team

Reserves team

References

External links

1998 births
Living people
Association football people from Osaka Prefecture
Japanese footballers
Association football forwards
Gamba Osaka players
Gamba Osaka U-23 players
Manchester City F.C. players
Heart of Midlothian F.C. players
Rio Ave F.C. players
G.D. Estoril Praia players
J1 League players
J3 League players
Scottish Professional Football League players
Primeira Liga players
Japanese expatriate footballers
Expatriate footballers in England
Expatriate footballers in Scotland
Expatriate footballers in Portugal
Japanese expatriate sportspeople in England
Japanese expatriate sportspeople in Scotland
Japanese expatriate sportspeople in Portugal